Shannon McIlroy (born 5 January 1987) is a New Zealand international lawn bowler.

Bowls career

World Outdoor Championships
McIlroy won a bronze medal in the Men's singles at the 2012 World Outdoor Bowls Championship in Adelaide.

In 2016, he won a bronze medal with Mike Kernaghan at the World Bowls Championship in the Men's Pairs competition in Christchurch before winning the gold medal in the singles.

In 2020 he was selected for the 2020 World Outdoor Bowls Championship in Australia.

Commonwealth Games
He was selected as part of the New Zealand team for the 2018 Commonwealth Games on the Gold Coast in Queensland where he reached the quarter finals of the men's singles.

In 2022, he competed in the men's singles and the men's pairs at the 2022 Commonwealth Games.

Asia Pacific
McIlroy has won six medals at the Asia Pacific Bowls Championships, a fours silver in 2007, a second silver in the triples in 2009 and a fours gold and pairs bronze in 2015 but his greatest success to date was winning double gold at the 2019 Asia Pacific Bowls Championships in the Gold Coast, Queensland, winning the singles and the pairs with Gary Lawson.

National
He won the 2015/16 and 2017/18 singles title at the New Zealand National Bowls Championships when bowling for the Stoke Bowls Club in addition to the 2004 & 2017/18 fours titles.

Personal life
Of Māori descent, McIlroy affiliates to the Ngāti Porou iwi. He married fellow lawn bowls player Amy Brenton in January 2013.

References

External links
 
 
 
 

1987 births
Living people
New Zealand male bowls players
Bowls World Champions
Sportspeople from Gisborne, New Zealand
Ngāti Porou people
Bowls players at the 2010 Commonwealth Games
Bowls players at the 2014 Commonwealth Games
Bowls players at the 2018 Commonwealth Games
Bowls players at the 2022 Commonwealth Games
Commonwealth Games competitors for New Zealand
20th-century New Zealand people
21st-century New Zealand people